The Blackburn First Monoplane (also known as Monoplane No 1) was a British experimental aircraft constructed by Robert Blackburn in 1909.

Design and development
The First Monoplane was a high-wing monoplane with the engine and pilot's seat located on a three-wheeled platform. A cruciform tail was carried on an uncovered boom extending from the wing. The 8 ft 6 in (2.59 m) propeller was mounted just below the wing's leading edge and driven by a chain to the 35 hp (26 kW) Green engine below.

Designed during a stay in Paris, construction began at Thomas Green & Sons engineering works at Leeds, where Blackburn's father was general manager and was later relocated to workshop space in a small clothing factory. When complete, it was transported to the beach between Saltburn and Marske for testing from April 1909. In that year, only taxying trials with the occasional hop were made. The only flight – on 24 May 1910 – lasted for around one minute, and ended in a crash in which the aircraft was damaged beyond repair. Blackburn later recalled the incident thus:

Survivors
The only aircraft was destroyed but a replica of the aircraft was constructed by members of the Brough Heritage Group and is displayed at the Brough Heritage Centre.

Specifications

References

 
 
 Blackburn Aircraft Company (archived page; details the construction of the replica)

1900s British experimental aircraft
First Monoplane
Single-engined tractor aircraft
High-wing aircraft
1909 in aviation
Aircraft first flown in 1909